The NWA Southeastern Tag Team Championship was the major tag team title in the National Wrestling Alliance's Alabama territory known as Southeastern Championship Wrestling. It existed from 1974 until November 1986, when it became the NWA Continental Tag Team Championship, after SECW changed its name to Continental Championship Wrestling. It became the CWF Tag Team Championship in 1988 when CCW changed its name to the Continental Wrestling Federation. The CWF closed in 1989 and the title was retired.

Title history

Footnotes

See also
National Wrestling Alliance
Southeast Championship Wrestling

References

National Wrestling Alliance championships
Continental Championship Wrestling championships
Tag team wrestling championships
Regional professional wrestling championships